Budz is a surname. Notable people with the surname include:

Johnny Budz, American DJ, producer, and remixer
Mark Budz (born 1960), American science fiction writer

See also
Bunz (disambiguation)